Epandulo Combined School is a school in Onalunike village in the Oshikoto Region of northern Namibia.

The school was established in the late 1970s and is serving both primary and junior secondary grades (grade 1 to grade 10). The first Principal was "Ouben" Benjamin, followed by Meme Namandje.

See also
 Education in Namibia
 List of schools in Namibia

References 

Schools in Oshikoto Region